Frances Marie Kenney (née Burke; May 4, 1922 – December 2, 2017) was an American beauty pageant contestant who was the winner of Miss America in 1940.

Biography
Burke, from Philadelphia, Pennsylvania, was crowned Miss America at the Boardwalk Hall in Atlantic City on September 7, 1940.

She competed in the pageant as Miss Philadelphia.

After winning the Miss America title Burke worked as a successful model. Despite opportunities in Hollywood, she chose to stay close to her family in Philadelphia.

Burke was married to Lawrence Kenney for 72 years and had four children (Missy, Wendy, Lawrence, and William) and was the grandmother of five boys and five girls.

She died at the home of her daughter on December 2, 2017, at the age of 95.

References

1922 births
2017 deaths
Miss America 1940s delegates
Miss America Preliminary Swimsuit winners
Miss America winners
People from Philadelphia
20th-century American people